Longridge Circuit was a motor racing circuit built in the former Tootle Heights quarry close to Longridge, Lancashire, England. This circuit may be unique in the world in being the only motor racing track situated in a quarry.

The roads used for the extremely short circuit were already in place when racing started in 1973, although sprint events were held prior to this.
 
In 1978 the site was sold, which caused considerable ill-feeling amongst those who organised the sport for both two and four wheels for they were not informed of the impending sale, and consequent loss of the venue as plans for 1979 were being laid.

References

Sport in Ribble Valley
Defunct motorsport venues in England
Defunct sports venues in Lancashire
Longridge